Amos 6 is the sixth chapter of the Book of Amos in the Hebrew Bible or the Old Testament of the Christian Bible. This book contains the prophecies attributed to the prophet Amos, especially denunciation of both the sister nations for wanton security — Zion, as well as Samaria; the voluptuousness of Israel, shall be punished with desolation, ; their perversion of justice and vain confidence shall end in affliction, . It is a part of the Book of the Twelve Minor Prophets.

Text 
The original text was written in Hebrew language. This chapter is divided into 14 verses.

Textual witnesses
Some early manuscripts containing the text of this chapter in Hebrew are of the Masoretic Text tradition, which includes the Codex Cairensis (895), the Petersburg Codex of the Prophets (916), Aleppo Codex (10th century), Codex Leningradensis (1008).

Fragments containing parts of this chapter were found among the Dead Sea Scrolls including 4Q78 (4QXIIc; 75–50 BCE) with extant verses 13–14; and 4Q82 (4QXIIg; 25 BCE) with extant verses 1–4, 6–14.

There is also a translation into Koine Greek known as the Septuagint, made in the last few centuries BCE. Extant ancient manuscripts of the Septuagint version include Codex Vaticanus (B; B; 4th century), Codex Alexandrinus (A; A; 5th century) and Codex Marchalianus (Q; Q; 6th century).

Verse 1
 Woe to them that are at ease in Zion,
 and trust in the mountain of Samaria,
 which are named chief of the nations,
 to whom the house of Israel came!
 "Them that are at ease in Zion": living in fancied security and self-pleasing. Judah is included in the denunciation, because she is equally guilty; the whole covenant nation is sunk in the same dangerous apathy. Septuagint, τοῖς ἐξουθενοῦσι Σιών, "them that set at naught Zion." The same rendering is found in the Syriac, and can be supported by a small change in the Hebrew. It may have been intended thus to confine the announcement to Israel alone, in conformity with the prophet's chief scope.
 "Trust in the mountain of Samaria": Not in God. Samaria was strong (see ), resisted for three years, and was the last city of Israel which was taken. "The king of Assyria came up throughout all the land and went up to Samaria, and besieged it . Benhadad, in that former siege, when God delivered them , attempted no assault, but famine only.
 "Which are named the chief of the nations": the persons at ease in Zion, and trusted in Samaria, were the principal men of both nations, Judah and Israel; or these cities of Zion and Samaria were the chief of the said nations: Zion, Which was near Jerusalem, and includes it, was the metropolis of Judea; as Samaria was the head city of Ephraim, or the ten tribes. The Targum is, that "put the name of their children, as the name of the children of the nations;" as the Jews did in later times, giving their children the names of Alexander, Antipater, etc.
 "To whom the house of Israel came": or "to which places all Israel had recourse"; so the two tribes went up to Zion, the ten tribes went to Samaria: or, to whom, i.e. to which nobles and rulers, the people of each kingdom did go on all occasions for judgment, counsel, or refuge.

See also

Related Bible parts: Amos 3, Amos 4, Amos 5

Notes

References

Sources

External links

Jewish
Amos 6 Hebrew with Parallel English
Amos 6 Hebrew with Rashi's Commentary

Christian
Amos 6 English Translation with Parallel Latin Vulgate

06